A Season of Giants (also known as Michelangelo: The Last Giant) is a 1990 American-Italian biographical drama television film directed by Jerry London. Based on the Vincenzo Labella's book Una stagione di giganti, it depicts real life events of Michelangelo, his youth, his approach with art, his friendship with Leonardo da Vinci and Raphael, and his involvement in great political and religious events.

Cast 

 Mark Frankel as Michelangelo 
 John Glover as Leonardo da Vinci
 F. Murray Abraham as Pope Julius II 
 Ornella Muti as Onoria 
 Ian Holm as Lorenzo De Medici 
 Steven Berkoff as Savonarola 
 Andrea Prodan as Raphael 
 Jonathan Hyde as Solderini 
 John Steiner as Cardinal Riario 
 Ricky Tognazzi as Niccolò Machiavelli 
 Julian Holloway as Aldovrandi
 Alessandro Gassman as Francesco Granacci
 Raf Vallone as Spanish Ambassador
 Pier Paolo Capponi as Burchard 
 Angelo Infanti as Jacopo from Fiesole
 Anna Kanakis as Sister Ilaria
 Daniela Poggi as Bianca
 Tony Vogel as Bramante  
 Giancarlo Prete as Angolo Poliziano 
 Vernon Dobtcheff as Jacopo Galli
 John Hallam as Ludovico Buonarroti 
 Mattia Sbragia as Lorenzo Di Pierfrancesco 
 Marne Maitland as Romolino
 Venantino Venantini as Cardinal Jean de Lagraulas
 Francesca D'Aloja as Mona Lisa
 Danja Gazzara as Lucrezia Borgia 
 Benito Stefanelli as the French Lieutenant
 Giuseppe Cederna as Cardiere 
 Enrico Lo Verso as Scultore

References

External links

1990 television films
1990 films
American biographical drama films
1990s biographical drama films
Depictions of Leonardo da Vinci on television
Cultural depictions of Michelangelo
Cultural depictions of Raphael
Cultural depictions of Niccolò Machiavelli
Cultural depictions of Girolamo Savonarola
Cultural depictions of Lucrezia Borgia
Cultural depictions of Lorenzo de' Medici
Pope Julius II
Films directed by Jerry London
Films scored by Riz Ortolani
1990s American films